New Hampshire Route 153 is a  secondary north–south highway in Strafford and Carroll counties in eastern New Hampshire.  The southern terminus is in Farmington at New Hampshire Route 11.  The northern terminus is in Conway village (town of Conway) at New Hampshire Route 16 and New Hampshire Route 113.

Between the towns of Wakefield and Effingham, NH 153 crosses into Maine, running for  within the town of Parsonsfield. The Maine Department of Transportation has installed Maine-style route shields along this section of the road, but the highway retains its New Hampshire designation.

NH 153 is one of two New Hampshire state highways that run within Maine; the other is NH 113B.

Route description 

NH 153 begins at NH 11 south of downtown Farmington and becomes the main road through town. NH 153 briefly overlaps with NH 75 in the center of town before continuing north. The highway skirts the western corner of Milton and continues into Middleton. Just south of downtown, NH 153 turns east and continues into Wakefield where it meets NH 125 in the village of Union. NH 125 and NH 153 are briefly cosigned before intersecting with NH 16 (the White Mountain Highway).  NH 125 has its northern terminus here, while NH 153 continues north, paralleling NH 16 towards the village of Sanbornville. NH 153 briefly overlaps with NH 109 in the village center, then continues north towards East Wakefield. The highway approaches the state border near Province Lake, then crosses the border into Parsonsfield, Maine.

NH 153 passes the Province Lake Country Club and proceeds due north along the state border, before turning fully back into New Hampshire in the town of Effingham. The highway continues north, continuing to parallel the border until meeting NH 25 at the Ossipee River. NH 153 continues through Freedom and Eaton without any major intersections, then crosses into the town of Conway, where it terminates in the center of Conway village at Main Street (NH 16 / NH 113).

Major intersections

References

External links

 New Hampshire State Route 153 on Flickr

153
Transportation in Strafford County, New Hampshire
Transportation in Carroll County, New Hampshire
Transportation in York County, Maine